The 1819 Delaware gubernatorial election was held on October 5, 1819. Incumbent Federalist Governor John Clark was unable to seek re-election due to term limits. State Senator Henry Molleston ran as Clark's successor, winning the Federalist nomination. He faced Manaen Bull, Clark's 1816 opponent, and the Democratic-Republican nominee. Molleston won by a fairly wide margin, but died on November 11, 1819, prior to assuming office. State Senate President Jacob Stout became Governor and a special election was held in 1820.

General election

Results

References

Bibliography
 
 
 

1819
Delaware
Gubernatorial